Fatma Nur Serter (born 10 November 1948) is a female Turkish academic and politician.

Life
Fatma Nur Aytekin was born to Mehmet Emin and Fahrinüssa in Istanbul, Turkey on 10 November 1948. She finished the Üsküdar American Academy for Girls, and graduated from the School of Economics of Istanbul University in 1970. She is married and mother of one.

Academic career
She joined the academic faculty of her school. In 1974, she obtained her PhD degree. She also studied in the London School of Economics. In 1982, she became an associate professor, and in 1988 full professor. Between 1998-2004, she was the Vice rector of Istanbul University.

Political career
She joined the Republican People's Party (CHP). In the elections held on 22 July 2007 and 12 June 2011, she was elected as a deputy from Istanbul Province in the 23rd and the 24th Parliament of Turkey.
 In this period, she was the member of Inter-Parliamentary Union. In 2004, following the resignation of Emine Ülker Tarhan, another woman politician from CHP, she was also expected to resign. However, she made a statement that she will stay in CHP.

Books
According to Kitapyurdu page, the books written by Seter are the following:
Dinde Siyasal Islamın Tekeli ("The Monopoly of the Political Islam in the Religion")
Giydirilmiş İnsan Kimliği ("Embedded Human Personaity")
21. Yüzyıla Doğru İnsan Merkezli Eğitim ("Human Based Education Towards 21st Century)
21 Yüzyılda İnsan Merkezli Eğitim ("Human Based Education in the 21st Century")

References

Living people
1948 births
Academic staff of Istanbul University
Üsküdar American Academy alumni
Istanbul University alumni
Alumni of the London School of Economics
Turkish women academics
20th-century Turkish women politicians
Republican People's Party (Turkey) politicians
Members of the 23rd Parliament of Turkey
Members of the 24th Parliament of Turkey
Delegates to the Inter-Parliamentary Union Assembly
20th-century Turkish women writers
21st-century Turkish women writers
20th-century Turkish writers
21st-century Turkish writers
21st-century Turkish women politicians